Guy Mitchell (born Albert George Cernik; February 22, 1927 – July 1, 1999) was an American pop singer and actor, successful in his homeland, the UK, and Australia.  He sold 44 million records, including six million-selling singles.

In the fall of 1957, Mitchell starred on the eponymous ABC's The Guy Mitchell Show. He appeared as George Romack on the 1961 NBC western detective series Whispering Smith.

Life and career

Born of Croatian immigrants in Detroit, Michigan, at age 11 he was signed by Warner Brothers Pictures, to be a child star, and  performed on the radio on KFWB in Los Angeles, California. After leaving school, he worked as a saddlemaker, supplementing his income by singing. Dude Martin, who had a country music broadcast in San Francisco, hired him for his band.

Mitchell served in the United States Navy for two years in World War II, then sang with Carmen Cavallaro's big band. In 1947 he recorded for Decca with Cavallaro's band, but left due to food poisoning. He went next to New York City and made records for King Records as Al Grant (one, "Cabaret", appeared in the Variety charts). He won on the radio show Arthur Godfrey's Talent Scouts in 1949 as a soloist.

Mitch Miller, in charge of talent at Columbia Records, noticed Cernik in 1950. He joined Columbia and took his new stage name at Miller's urging. Mitch Miller originally had intended to record a sentimental ballad called "My Heart Cries for You" with Frank Sinatra, however, Sinatra was not interested and rejected the songs arranged for him to record that day.  Given that Miller had already booked the musicians for the recording session, he invited Cernik to come in the evening to record the song as a replacement. The recording went well, and Miller then told him that he should change his name as Miller could not pronounce the name Cernik.  Initially reluctant, he then took Miller's name Mitchell, and added Guy as he liked to say "Hi, Guy" in reply to other people's "Hello", and became Guy Mitchell for the record release.  "My Heart Cries for You" became Mitchell's first hit song, reaching No. 2 on the Billboard charts. 

After "My Heart Cries for You", he had a number of other hits included "Heartaches by the Number", "Rock-a-Billy" (a crossover into the rock and roll field), and "The Same Old Me". His biggest hit was "Singing the Blues", which was number one for 10 weeks in 1956. Bob Merrill wrote a number of hits for Mitchell. 

In the 1950s and 1960s Mitchell acted in such movies as Those Redheads From Seattle (1953) and Red Garters (1954). He appeared in "Choose a Victim", a 1961 episode of Thriller.  

In 1990, he appeared in several episodes of the BBC drama series Your Cheatin' Heart as the fictional country singer Jim Bob O'May, singing several standards including his own hit "Singing the Blues".

Death
Mitchell died on July 1, 1999, aged 72, at Desert Springs Hospital in Las Vegas, Nevada of complications from cancer surgery.

Tribute
In 2007, to commemorate what would have been his 80th birthday, the English division of SonyBMG released The Essential Collection CD. His song "Heartaches by the Number" was part of the soundtrack of the 2010 video game Fallout: New Vegas.

Singles discography

Best known songs
"My Heart Cries for You" (1950)
"The Roving Kind" (1951)
"My Truly, Truly Fair" (1951)
"Sparrow In The Treetop" (1951)
"Pittsburgh, Pennsylvania" (1952)
"She Wears Red Feathers" (1953)
"Belle, Belle, My Liberty Belle" (1951)
"Feet Up (Pat Him On The Po-po)" (1952)
"Heartaches by the Number" (1959)
"Knee Deep in the Blues" (1957)
"Look At That Girl" (1953)
"Ninety Nine Years (Dead or Alive)" (1956)
"Pretty Little Black Eyed Susie" (1953)
"Rock-a-Billy" (1957)
"The Same Old Me" (1960)
"Singing the Blues" (1956)
"The Roving Kind" (1950)
"Cloud Lucky Seven" (1953)
"Unless" (1951)

Re-recorded songs
In February 1982 he re-recorded 20 of his popular songs with new musical backings (in stereo) at the Audio Media Studio in Nashville, Tennessee for Bulldog Records (No. BDL 2041 in the UK). The album was entitled "20 Golden Pieces of Guy Mitchell" (not to be confused with "20 Golden Greats" by Mitchell released in 1979). The songs on the album are:-

Side 1
Pittsburgh, Pennsylvania
Feet Up (Pat Him on the Popo)
Heartaches by the Number
She Wears Red Feathers
Sparrow in the Tree Top
Sippin' Soda
Rockabilly
Cuff of my Shirt
Cloud Lucky Seven
Chicka Boom

Side 2
Pretty Little Black Eyed Susie
Side by Side
Music, Music, Music
The Rovin' Kind
My Heart Cries for You
My Shoes Keep Walking Back
Call Rosie on the Phone
My Truly, Truly Fair
Knee Deep in the Blues
Singin' the Blues

References

External links
Guy Mitchell Appreciation Society site, belle49.freeserve.co.uk
Guy Mitchell obituary
Biodata, "The Interlude Era" site], earthlink.net

1927 births
1999 deaths
United States Navy personnel of World War II
Traditional pop music singers
Starday Records artists
Columbia Records artists
People from the Las Vegas Valley
Western (genre) television actors
20th-century American singers
Singers from Detroit
20th-century American male singers
Deaths from cancer in Nevada